Philosophy in a New Key: A Study in the Symbolism of Reason, Rite and Art is the main work of American philosopher Susanne K. Langer, first published in 1941. In it she declares that "Symbolism was the ‘new key’ to understanding how the human mind transformed the primal need to express oneself."

Synopsis
"Langer elaborates her thesis in freshly conceived and interesting studies contained in chapters treating of the logic of signs and symbols, a comparison of discursive and presentational forms of
symbolism (perhaps the heart of the book), verbal language, life symbols as the roots of sacrament and myth, the significance of music, the genesis of artistic import, and the fabric of meaning."

Notes

References

Secondary

Adams, Hazard,  "Langer's New Key."  Philosophy of the Literary Symbolic.  Tallahassee: UP of Florida, 1983.  221-232.
Schultz, William, Cassirer and Langer on Myth, 2000

External links
Prefaces to the 1941 and 1951 editions.
Book at Harvard University Press

1941 non-fiction books
English-language books
Philosophy books